The Basilica of Saint John the Baptist is a Roman Catholic church in Canton, Ohio, United States. The building was designed by American architect James Renwick, Jr. (1818–1895). Construction was completed in 1871, and the church was dedicated in 1872.

Saint John the Baptist was elevated to a minor basilica on June 19, 2012.  The Most Reverend George V. Murry, Bishop of the Diocese of Youngstown, was the celebrant, assisted by Very Reverend Robert Siffrin, Vicar General.

The parish of St John the Baptist is the "oldest Catholic parish in northeastern Ohio", having been established in 1823.

The Basilica houses a seventy-nine rank pipe organ built by Kegg Pipe Organ Builders of Hartville, Ohio.  The specifications can be obtained here.

The Very Reverend Ronald M. Klingler served as Pastor/Rector for thirty years until his retirement on August 1, 2017.  The Very Reverend John E. Sheridan, STL was appointed the second Rector of the Basilica on August 1, 2017, as well as Pastor of Saint Peter Church, Canton.

References

External links

Churches in the Roman Catholic Diocese of Youngstown
Churches on the National Register of Historic Places in Ohio
Gothic Revival church buildings in Ohio
Roman Catholic churches completed in 1871
Churches in Stark County, Ohio
National Register of Historic Places in Stark County, Ohio
John the Baptist, Canton
Churches in Canton, Ohio
Tourist attractions in Canton, Ohio
19th-century Roman Catholic church buildings in the United States